Peter Thomas (born 1954) is a former Grenadian cricketer who represented the Windward Islands in West Indian domestic cricket. He played as a right-arm medium-pace bowler.

Thomas made his first-class debut for the Windwards in July 1973, in a friendly against the Leeward Islands. After that, he did not return to the line-up until the 1976–77 season, when he made three first-class appearances (two against the Leeward Islands and one against the touring Pakistanis). He also played two limited-overs matches in the 1976–77 Gillette Cup. During the 1977–78 season, Thomas took 4/47, a career-best in first-class cricket, in an inter-island game against the Leewards. He also played in a four-day game against the touring Australians, taking the wickets of Alan Ogilvie and Kim Hughes. Thomas's final matches in top-level West Indian cricket came during the 1978–79 season. In what was to be his final appearance for the Windward Islands, he took 4/35 from nine overs in a one-day game against Trinidad and Tobago, although his performance was not enough to prevent his team's defeat.

References

External links
Player profile and statistics at CricketArchive
Player profile and statistics at ESPNcricinfo

1954 births
Living people
Grenadian cricketers
Windward Islands cricketers